Hay Creek is an unincorporated community located in the town of Bridge Creek, Eau Claire County, Wisconsin, United States.

Notes

Unincorporated communities in Eau Claire County, Wisconsin
Unincorporated communities in Wisconsin